Jan Adam Zandleven (6 February 1868, Koog aan de Zaan – 16 July 1923, Rhenen) was a Dutch painter, mostly of landscapes and still-lifes.

Biography 
He was the son of a paint manufacturer and merchant. Although he always wanted to be an artist, he never took formal lessons and worked for his father's company until 1901, when some of his works received positive reviews from Paul Gabriël and Jozef Israëls. Despite continuing opposition from his father, he chose to become a painter and made the acquaintance of the art dealer, Henk Bremmer, who gave him advice and financial support, as well as introducing him to the art collector, Helene Kröller-Müller, who became a major patron.

In 1904, he and his wife settled in Gorssel, lived briefly in Hengelo, then moved to Putten, near the  Veluwe in 1912, where he spent much of his time painting in the woods; sometimes accompanied by his friend, the still-life painter Jan Carbaat. A deeply religious man, this would often produce a state akin to meditation and the degree of his concentration is clearly visible in his attention to small details. The influence of Impressionism is obvious, but his technique was more closely related to Pointillism.

Between 1916 and 1922, he exhibited regularly at the "Kunsthandel Gerbrands" in Utrecht. After 1918, he lived in Rhenen, where he died. Major retrospectives have been held at the Stedelijk Museum in 1929 and, more recently, at the Museum Flehite in 2012.

Selected paintings

References

Further reading 
 Onno Maurer, Katjuscha Otte, Jaap Verhage: Jan Adam Zandleven. (exhibition catalog) Scriptum, Schiedam, 2012

External links 

Jan Adam Zandleven Museum, Home Page.
ArtNet: More works by Zandleven.

1868 births
1923 deaths
20th-century Dutch painters
Dutch male painters
Dutch landscape painters
Dutch still life painters
Dutch Impressionist painters
People from Zaanstad
20th-century Dutch male artists